Gao Xiong may refer to:

Kaohsiung, or Gaoxiong, city in Taiwan
Eddy Ko (born 1937), or Gao Xiong, Hong Kong actor